Kendji is the self-titled debut album by French singer Kendji Girac released on 8 September 2014 by Mercury Records. In France, it appeared at number one of SNEP, the official French Albums Chart, it also became a hit in Belgium and Switzerland.

Two of the tracks, namely "Color Gitano" and "Bella" had earlier appeared in a 5-track EP titled Kendji Girac EP released prior to the release of the album. The EP charted in June 2014 reaching number 44 on the SNEP French Albums Chart. The EP contained three more tracks that were not included in the album: "Toi et moi", "Ma philosophie" and "Tous les mêmes".

Track listing

Notes
 signifies a co-producer
 signifies a vocal producer

Charts

Weekly charts

Year-end charts

Certifications

References

2014 debut albums
Kendji Girac albums